Tugaske is a Martian impact crater, approximately  in diameter. It is located at 32.1°S, 101.2°W, south of the crater Dinorwic and southeast of the crater Virrat. It is named after a town in Saskatchewan, Canada, and its name was approved by the International Astronomical Union in 1991. According to a surface age map of Mars based on US Geological Survey data, the area around Tugaske is from the Noachian epoch, which places the area's age at 3.8 to 3.5 billion years ago.

References

Impact craters on Mars
Thaumasia quadrangle